Rubus alnifolius is an uncommon Mexican species of brambles in the rose family. It has been found only in the State of Veracruz in eastern Mexico.

Rubus alnifolius is a trailing or reclining perennial with curved prickles. Leaves are compound with 3 thick and leathery leaflets. Fruits are dark purple and oblong.

References

alnifolius
Flora of Veracruz
Plants described in 1913